René Bidal (born 28 January 1960 in Béziers, France) is a French senior civil servant. He served as High Commissioner of the Republic in French Polynesia and earlier was Prefect of the departments of Eure, Pyrénées-Orientales, and Hautes-Pyrénées. He had previously served in a variety of positions in Eure-et-Loir (1986–89), Landes (1992–93), Finistère (1993–96), Aveyron (1996–98), Guingamp (1998–2000), Charente-Maritime (2000–03), Hauts-de-Seine (2003–06), Béthune (2006–08), and Rhône (2008–10).

He was named to his post as Prefect of Maine-et-Loire on 7 June 2019, succeeding Bernard Gonzalez, who had been named Prefect of Alpes-Maritimes.

Honours and decorations

National honours

Ministerial honours

Civilian medals

References

External links
  Biography at Ministry of Overseas France
  Biography at Government of French Polynesia

1960 births
High Commissioners of the Republic in French Polynesia
French civil servants
Living people
People from Béziers
Officers of the Ordre national du Mérite
Chevaliers of the Légion d'honneur
Chevaliers of the Ordre des Palmes Académiques
Knights of the Order of Agricultural Merit